Nadando com os Tubarões (Portuguese for "Swimming Alongside the Sharks") is the third album by Brazilian alternative rock band Charlie Brown Jr., released in November 2000 through Virgin Records. It was the band's final album with original guitarist Thiago Castanho, who left the following year citing his dissatisfaction with their extensive touring schedule; however, he would return in 2005.

The album counts with guest appearances by hip hop groups Controlamente, RZO – at the time still fronted by Sabotage – and De Menos Crime, returning from Preço Curto... Prazo Longo; and rappers Negra Li – who wrote the lyrics of the hit "Não É Sério" – and Radjja de Santos, another previous collaborator. Producer Tadeu Patolla was also a co-author of "O Penetra".

Nadando com os Tubarões sold over 100,000 copies, receiving a Gold certification by Pro-Música Brasil, and in 2001 was nominated for both a Latin Grammy Award for Best Portuguese Language Rock or Alternative Album and a Multishow Brazilian Music Award. A music video which counted with a guest appearance by comedy troupe Hermes & Renato was made for "Rubão, o Dono do Mundo".

Critical reception
Writing for Galeria Musical, Anderson Nascimento gave the album a negative review, rating it with 2 stars out of 5. He claimed that, while the album is "heavier" than its predecessors, overall it seems "rushed" and "unfinished". Nevertheless, he praised the tracks "Rubão, o Dono do Mundo", "Não É Sério", "O Penetra" and "Tudo Mudar".

Track listing

Personnel
Charlie Brown Jr.
 Chorão – vocals
 Champignon – bass guitar, backing vocals  (on "Pra Mais Tarde Fazermos a Cabeça"), beatboxing
 Thiago Castanho – rhythm and lead guitar
 Marcão – lead and rhythm guitar
 Renato Pelado – drums

Additional musicians
 DJ Anderson Franja – scratches
 Controlamente – additional vocals in "Ralé"
 De Menos Crime – vocals in "Somos Extremes no Esporte e na Música"
 Radjja de Santos – vocals in "No Desafio, Ibiraboys/A União Prevalece"
 Mikimba – vocals in "No Desafio, Ibiraboys/A União Prevalece"
 RZO – additional vocals in "A Banca"
 Negra Li – additional vocals in "Não É Sério"
 Maestro Mojica – trumpet in "Ralé"
 Tadeu Patolla – electric guitar in "O Penetra"

Production
 Charlie Brown Jr. – production
 Tadeu Patolla – production
 Paulo Anhaia – recording and mixing
 Rodrigo Castanho – mastering
 Paulo Anhaia and Lampadinha – ProTools engineers
 Lampadinha – additional cuts
 Marcelo Bacará, Nilton Baloni and Renato Patriarca – recording assistants

References

2000 albums
Virgin Records albums
Charlie Brown Jr. albums